This is an incomplete list of Supreme Court of the United States cases in the area of trademark law.

References 
 David S. Welkowitz, "The Supreme Court and Trademark Law in the New Millennium", 30 William Mitchell Law Review 1659 (2004)
 Derek Simpson and Lee Petherbridge, "An Empirical Study of the Use of Legal Scholarship in Supreme Court Trademark Jurisprudence", 35 Cardozo Law Review 931 (2014) (also available at http://ssrn.com/abstract=2238523).

See also
 List of trademark case law
 List of United States Supreme Court copyright case law
 List of United States Supreme Court patent case law

Trademark law
Trademark